3C 61.1 is a Seyfert galaxy located in the constellation Cepheus.

References

External links
 Simbad
 www.jb.man.ac.uk/atlas/

Cepheus (constellation)
Seyfert galaxies
061.1
2832137
8C 0210+860